Wing Zone is a Las Vegas-based American chain of restaurants that specializes in chicken wings owned by Capriotti's. The chain has over 30 restaurants in the United States and over 60 internationally. In 2022, Capriotti's announced that Wing Zone will be expanding, with 50 new locations into India.

History
The Wing Zone was founded in 1991 by Matt Friedman and Adam Scott, two students at the University of Florida. The two partners took over their fraternity kitchen at nights and began developing their recipes. Friedman and Scott opened up their first two locations in Gainesville, Florida in 1993. As of 2014, Wing Zone has opened eight locations in Panama City, Panama. In 2014, Wing Zone opened their second international location in San Pedro Sula, Honduras. In 2015, Wing Zone opened their third international location in Guatemala City, Guatemala. In 2021, Capriotti's purchased the company and relocated the headquarters to Las Vegas.

See also
Buffalo wings
 List of fast-food chicken restaurants

References

External links
 

Regional restaurant chains in the United States
Fast-food chains of the United States
Restaurants established in 1991
Fast-food poultry restaurants
1991 establishments in Nevada
Chicken chains of the United States